The Man of the Hour (French: L'homme du jour) is a 1937 French musical film directed by Julien Duvivier and starring Maurice Chevalier, Elvire Popesco and Josette Day. The film was shot at the Joinville Studios, with sets designed by the art director Jacques Krauss. An ordinary man saves the life of a great actress by giving blood, and she in turns decides to promote him as a singing star.

Partial cast
 Maurice Chevalier as Alfred Boulard / Himself  
 Elvire Popesco as Mona Thalia  
 Josette Day as Suzanne Petit  
 Raymond Aimos as Le vieux cabot 
 André Alerme as François-Théophile Cormier de la Creuse  
 Marguerite Deval as Mme Christoforo  
 Marcelle Géniat as Alphonsine Boulard - la mère d'Alfred  
 Paulette Élambert as La petite soeur de Suzanne  
 Robert Lynen as Milot - l'apprenti électricien  
 Marcelle Praince as Mme Pinchon - une pensionnaire  
 Robert Pizani as Le poète efféminé  
 Pierre Sergeol as La Breloque  
 Charlotte Barbier-Krauss as Mme Legal - la patronne de la pension de famille  
 Simone Deguyse as La petite femme à la terrasse du café  
 Renée Devillers as Fanny Couvrain - la fille aux fleurs  
 Fernand Fabre as Le peintre à la réception  
 Jeanne Fusier-Gir as La chanteuse à l'audition  
 Germaine Michel as La bouchère 
 Missia as La dame du monde à la réception

References

Bibliography 
 Lucy Mazdon & Catherine Wheatley. Je T Aime... Moi Non Plus: Franco-British Cinematic Relations. Berghahn Books, 2010.

External links 
 

1937 films
French musical films
1937 musical films
1930s French-language films
Films directed by Julien Duvivier
Films shot at Joinville Studios
French black-and-white films
1930s French films